Chambray-lès-Tours (literally Chambray near Tours) is a commune in the Indre-et-Loire department, central France. It is the birthplace of professional footballer Adam Ounas.

Population

See also
Communes of the Indre-et-Loire department

References

Communes of Indre-et-Loire